Bill Miller (born June 1, 1956) is an American football coach. He served as defensive coordinator at Nevada, Oklahoma State, Miami (FL), Michigan State, Arizona State, Western Michigan, and Kansas.

References

1956 births
Living people
Arizona Wildcats football coaches
Drake Bulldogs football coaches
Florida Gators football coaches
Florida State Seminoles football coaches
Hutchinson Blue Dragons football players
Kansas Jayhawks football coaches
Louisville Cardinals football coaches
Miami Hurricanes football coaches
Michigan State Spartans football coaches
Minnesota Golden Gophers football coaches
Nevada Wolf Pack football coaches
Oklahoma State Cowboys football coaches
Texas–Arlington Mavericks football players
Western Michigan Broncos football coaches
Sportspeople from Topeka, Kansas